This is a list of newspapers in Michigan.

Daily and weekly newspapers (currently published)
 The Alcona Review - Harrisville
 Cadence Newspaper - Ada
 Access - Adrian
 The Daily Telegram - Adrian
 Michigan Christian Advocate - Adrian
 Siena Heights University Spectra - Adrian
 The Recorder - Albion
 The Allegan County News  - Allegan
 Grand Valley Advance - Allendale
 The Alpena News - Alpena
 The Ann Arbor Independent - Ann Arbor
 The Ann Arbor News - Ann Arbor
 Washtenaw Jewish News - Ann Arbor
 The Michigan Daily - Ann Arbor, University of Michigan
 Monroe Street Journal - Ann Arbor, University of Michigan, Ross School of Business
 Montmorency County Tribune - Atlanta
 Huron Daily Tribune - Bad Axe
 Huron County View - Bad Axe
 Lake County Star - Baldwin
 Battle Creek Enquirer  - Battle Creek
 Battle Creek Shopper News - Battle Creek
 Senior Times Newspaper - Battle Creek
 The Bay City Times - Bay City
 Beaverton Clarion - Beaverton
 The Antrim Review - Bellaire
 Belleville Area Independent - Belleville
 Belleville Enterprise - Belleville
 The Eagle - Belleville
 Northeast Advance - Belmont
 Benton Spirit - Benton Harbor
 The Herald-Palladium - Benton Harbor
 MailMax - Benton Harbor
 Southfield Eccentric - Berkley
 Woodward Talk - Berkley
 The Journal Era - Berrien
 Birmingham-Bloomfield Eagle - Beverly Hills
 [[The Pioneer (Big Rapids)|The Pioneer]] - Big Rapids
 Birmingham-Bloomfield Eagle - Bingham Farms
 Birch Run/Bridgeport Herald - Birch Run
 Observer Eccentric  - Birmingham
 Birmingham-Bloomfield Eagle - Birmingham
 The Oakland Press - Birmingham
 Blissfield Advance - Blissfield
 Birmingham-Bloomfield Eagle - Bloomfield Hills
 The Oakland Press - Bloomfield Hills
 Birmingham-Bloomfield Eagle - Bloomfield Township
 The Boyne City Gazette - Boyne City
 Birch Run/Bridgeport Herald - Bridgeport
 Inside Business Journal - Brighton
 Bay Mills News - Brimley
 Bronson Journal-ceased publication on Nov. 16, 2017. - Bronson
 The Exponent - Brooklyn
 Brown City Banner - Brown City
 Berrien County Record - Buchanan
 Burton View - Burton
 The South Independent - Byron
 Southwest Advance - Byron Center
 Cadillac Evening News - Cadillac
 The Sun & News - Caledonia
 Southeast Advance - Caledonia
 The Eagle - Canton
 Canton Observer - Canton and Canton Township
 Tuscola County Advertiser - Caro
 Carson City Gazette - Carson City
 Cadence Newspaper - Cascade
 Cass City Chronicle - Cass City
 Cassopolis Vigilant - Cassopolis
 The Cedar Springs Post - Cedar Springs
 Northeast Advance - Cedar Springs

 Warren Weekly - Center Line
 Central Lake News - Central Lake
 Central Michigan Life - Central Michigan University
 Charlevoix Courier - Charlevoix
 Community Newspaper - Charlotte
 Eaton Rapids Community News - Charlotte
 The County Journal - Charlotte
 Cheboygan Daily Tribune - Cheboygan
 Straitsland Resorter - Cheboygan
 Chelsea Standard (Ceased publication June 25, 2015) - Chelsea
 The Sun Times News - Chelsea
 Tri-County Citizen - Chesaning
 The North Independent - Chesaning
 The Clare County Review  - Clare
 Clarkston News - Clarkston
 The Oakland Press - Clarkston
 Clawson Mirror - Clawson
 Royal Oak Review - Clawson
 Southfield Eccentric - Clawson
 Climax Crescent - Climax
 Clinton Local - Clinton
 Clinton Township Chronicle - Clinton Township
 Mount Clemens-Clinton-Harrison Journal - Clinton Township
 Fraser-Clinton Twp. Chronicle - Clinton Township
 The Daily Reporter - Coldwater
 Northwest Advance - Coopersville
 The Herald (Discontinued in 2017) - Cornerstone University
 The North Independent - Corunna
 Southeast Advance - Cutlerville
 Davison Index - Davison
 Dearborn Times-Herald - Dearborn
 Iraq Sun (Described as defunct in this wiki article) - Dearborn
 Press and Guide - Dearborn
 Sada al-Watan (Arab American News) - Dearborn
 Delta Collegiate - Delta College
 Advertiser Times - Detroit
 Between the Lines - Detroit
 The Building Tradesman - Detroit
 Crain's Detroit Business - Detroit
 De Mujer A Mujer - Detroit
 Detroit Free Press - Detroit

 The Jewish News - Detroit
 Detroit Legal News - Detroit
 Detroit Monitor - Detroit
 The Detroit News - Detroit
 Dziennik Polski - Detroit
 El Central Hispanic News - Detroit
 La Prensa - Detroit
 Latino Press - Detroit
 Legal Advertiser - Detroit
 Metro Times - Detroit
 Michigan Chronicle - Detroit
 Polish Weekly - Detroit
 Real Detroit Weekly (Ceased 2014) - Detroit
 Ukrain'ski Visti (Ceased May 30, 2000, according to Library of Congress) - Detroit
 Dexter Leader (Ceased publication in 1995) - Dexter
 Penasee Globe - Dorr
 Daily News - Dowagiac
 Drummond Island Digest - Drummond Island
 The Independent - Dundee
 The South Independent - Durand
 Southeast Advance - Dutton
 Cadence Newspaper - East Grand Rapids
 The State News - East Lansing, Michigan State University
 Roseville-Eastpointe Eastsider - Eastpointe
 Iosco County News-Herald - East Tawas
 The Eastern Echo - Eastern Michigan University
 Flashes Advertising & News - Eaton Rapids
 Telegram Newspaper - Ecorse
 Edwardsburg Argus - Edwardsburg
 Town Meeting - Elk Rapids
 The Daily Press - Escanaba
 Farmington Observer - Farmington
 The Hills Herald - Farmington Hills
 Farmington Press - Farmington and Farmington Hills
 Fenton Patch - Fenton
 Tri-County Times - Fenton
 Southfield Eccentric - Ferndale
 Oakland County 115 - Ferndale
 Woodward Talk - Ferndale
 Ferris State University/ The Torch - Ferris State University
 The Flint Journal - Flint
 Genesee County Legal News - Flint
 Flint Township View - Flint Township
 Cadence Newspaper - Forest Hills
 Fowlerville News and Views - Fowlerville
 The Flushing Observer - Flushing
 Frankenmuth News - Frankenmuth
 Benzie County Record Patriot - Frankfort
 Birmingham-Bloomfield Eagle - Franklin
 Fraser-Clinton Twp. Chronicle - Fraser
 Times Indicator - Fremont
 Garden City Observer - Garden City
 Otsego County Voice - Gaylord
 Gaylord Herald Times - Gaylord
 Beaverton Clarion - Gladwin
 Gladwin County Record - Gladwin
 Grand Blanc View - Grand Blanc
 Grand Haven Tribune - Grand Haven
 Community News - Grand Ledge
 Business Update - Grand Rapids
 El Informador - Grand Rapids
 El Vocero Hispano - Grand Rapids
 Grand Rapids Business Journal - Grand Rapids
 Grand Rapids Legal News - Grand Rapids
 The Grand Rapids Press - Grand Rapids
 Grand Rapids Times - Grand Rapids
 Latino News - Grand Rapids
 Lazo Cultural - Grand Rapids
 Cadence Newspaper - Grand Rapids (northeast) Ada
 Collegiate (newspaper) - Grand Rapids Community College
 Grand Rapids Township -- Cadence Newspaper Grand Valley Lanthorn - Grand Valley State University
 Times of Grass Lake - Grass Lake
 Grand Valley Advance - Grandville
 The Grass Lake Times - Grass Lake
 Grayling
 Crawford County Avalanche - Grayling
 The Daily News - Greenville
 Ile Camera (Ceased publication in September 2009) - Grosse Ile
 Grosse Pointe News - Grosse Pointe
 Grosse Pointe Times-Serving all five Grosse Pointes - Grosse Pointe
 Penasee Globe - Gun Lake
 Hamtramck Review - Hamtramck
 Harbor Beach  The Lakeshore Guardian, serving Huron, Sanilac, St. Clair, and Tuscola Counties, Michigan
 Harbor Light - Harbor Springs
 Advertiser Times - Harper Woods
 Clare County Cleaver - Harrison
 Mount Clemens-Clinton-Harrison Journal - Harrison Township
 Alcona County Review - Harrisville
 Oceana's Herald-Journal - Hart
 Hastings Banner - Hastings
 Madison-Park News - Madison Heights
 The North Independent - Henderson
 Henry Ford College/ Mirror News - Henry Ford College
 Spinal Column Newsweekly - Highland
 Hillsdale Daily News - Hillsdale
 The Collegian - Hillsdale College
 Montmorency County Tribune - Hillman
 The Collegian - Hillsdale
 Hillsdale Daily News - Hillsdale
 The Holland Sentinel - Holland
 Holt Community News - Holt
 Homer Index - Homer
 Penasee Globe - Hopkins
 The Daily Mining Gazette - Houghton
 [File:Daily-Mining-Gazette-Houghton-MI.jpg|thumb|The Daily Mining Gazette offices, located in Houghton, Michigan
 Michigan Tech Lode - Houghton Michigan Technological University
 Houghton Lake Resorter - Houghton Lake
 Roscommon County Herald-News - Houghton Lake
 Livingston County Daily Press & Argus - Howell
 The Livonia Observer, Livonia, Michigan, ceased printing in December 2022, but an online edition persists.  That paper had an circulation of over 14,000.  It was part of a larger slaughter of local newspapers.  Gannett shut six newspapers down in a stroke.  "The publisher said publications will continue online and there were no new layoffs associated with the print finale. Currently are only five reporters to cover the communities that number about one million people. Gannett said  they will maintain print editions in Northville, Novi, Milford and South Lyon."
 Hudson Post-Gazette - Hudson
 Grand Valley Advance - Hudsonville
 Southfield Eccentric - Huntington Woods
 Woodward Talk - Huntington Woods
 Tri-City Times - Imlay City
 Straitsland Resorter - Indian River
 Inkster Ledger Star - Inkster
 The Eagle - Inkster
 Ionia Sentinel-Standard - Ionia
 The Daily News - Iron Mountain
 The Iron County Reporter - Iron River
 Ironwood Daily Globe - Ironwood
 Gratiot County Herald - Iathaca
 Jackson Citizen Patriot - Jackson
 Jackson County Legal News - Jackson
 Grand Valley Advance - Jenison
 Community Voices Magazine - Kalamazoo
 Kalamazoo Gazette - Kalamazoo
 The Kalkaskian  - Kalkaska
 West Bloomfield Beacon - Keego Harbor
 Southeast Advance - Kentwood
 * The Daily News (Kingsford) - Kingsford
 L'Anse Sentinel - L'Anse
 The North Independent - Laingsburg
 The Missaukee Sentinel - Lake City
 Lake Orion Eccentric - Lake Orion
 The Oakland Press - Lake Orion
 Leelanau Enterprise - Lake Leelanau
 Lakewood News - Lake Odessa
 The Lake Orion Review - Lake Orion
 Lakeview Area News - Lakeview
 Bridge Magazine - Lansing
 City Pulse - Lansing
 Lansing State Journal - Lansing
 The Lookout (newspaper) - Lansing Community College
 County Press, formerly Lapeer County Press - Lapeer
 Lapeer Area View - Lapeer
 Southfield Sun - Lathrup Village
 The Leelanau Enterprise - Leland
 The South Independent - Lennon
 Livingston County Daily Press & Argus  - Livingston County
 Between The Lines - Livonia
 Livonia Observer  Ceased printing in December 2022, but an on line edition persists.
 Lowell Ledger - Lowell
 Ludington Daily News - Ludington
 Mackinac Island Town Crier - Mackinac Island
 Macomb Legal News - Macomb County, Michigan
 The Macomb Daily - Macomb
 Macomb Chronicle - Macomb Township
 Italian Tribune-La Tribuna del Popolo - Macomb
 Madison-Park News - Madison Heights
 Manchester Enterprise - Manchester
 Manchester Mirror - Manchester
 Michigan Advance News Advocate - Manistee
 Pioneer-Tribune - Manistique
 The Marion Press  - Marion
 The Marlette Leader - Marlette
 The Mining Journal - Marquette
 Northern Michigan University North Wind - Marquette
 Ad-visor & Chronicle* - Marshall
 Ingham County Legal News - Mason
 Michigan Tech Lode - Michigan Technological University
 The Sun & News - Middleville
 Midland Daily News - Midland
 Michigan Capitol Confidential - Midland
 Milan News - Milan
 The Milan Eagle - Milan
 Milford Times - Milford
 The Oakland Press - Milford
 Minden City Herald - Minden City
 Monroe Business Journal - Monroe
 Monroe Evening News - Monroe
 Monroe Guardian - Monroe
 Monroe News - Monroe
 The Agora - Monroe County Community College
 Montmorency County Tribune - Montmorency County
 Morenci Observer - Morenci
 State Line Observer - Morenci
 The Macomb Daily - Mount Clemens
 Mount Clemens-Clinton-Harrison Journal - Mount Clemens
 Mount Morris/Clio Herald - Mount Morris
 Morning Sun - Mount Pleasant
 Munising News - Munising
 Muskegon Chronicle - Muskegon
 Norton-Lakeshore Examiner - Muskegon
 Muskegon County Legal News - Muskegon
 The Bay Window - Muskegon Community College
 Maple Valley News - Nashville
 The Voice - New Baltimore
 Harbor Country News - New Buffalo
 New Buffalo Times - New Buffalo
 Newberry News - Newberry
 The North Independent - New Lothrop
 Daily Star - Niles
 Northville Record  - Northville
 The Eagle - Northville
 The Current - Norway
 Michigan Lawyers Weekly - Novi
 Novi News  - Novi
 Oakland County Legal News - Oakland County, Michigan
 The Oakland Press - Oakland County
 Oakland County 115 - Oakland County
 Oakland Lakefront Lifestyle Magazine - Oakland County
 Rochester Post - Oakland Township
 The Oakland Post - Oakland University
 The Echo - Olivet College
 The Onaway Outlook - Onaway
 The Ontonogan Herald - Ontonogan
 West Bloomfield Beacon - Orchard Lake
 The Citizen - Ortonville
 Oscoda Press - Oscoda
 The Union Enterprise  - Otsego
 Argus-Press - Owosso
 Independent Newsgroup - Owosso
 The North Independent - Owosso
 Oxford Eccentric - Oxford
 Oxford Leader - Oxford
 Paw Paw -The Courier-Leader The South Independent - Perry
 Petoskey News-Review - Petoskey
 Pinconning Journal - Pinconning
 Cadence Newspaper - Plainfield
 The Union Enterprise  - Plainwell
 Woodward Talk - Pleasant Ridge
 Plymouth Observer - Plymouth
 The Eagle - Plymouth
 The Oakland Press - Pontiac
 Port Austin Times - Port Austin
 The Times Herald - Port Huron
 Portland Review & Observer - Portland
 Herald-Review (Reed City) - Reed City
 Redford Neighborhood Connection - Redford
 Redford Observer - Redford
 Richland Express - Richland
 Rochester Eccentric - Rochester
 Rochester & Rochester Hills Gazette - Rochester Hills
 Rochester Post - Rochester and Rochester Hills
 Northeast Advance (ceased publication in 2019) - Rockford
 Rockford Squire - Rockford
 Presque Isle County Advance - Rogers City
 Presque Isle County Advance (and Onaway Outlook) - Rogers City
 The Romeo Observer - Romeo
 Detroit Metropolitan Airport News - Romulus
 Huron River Weekly - Romulus
 Romulus Roman - Romulus
 The Eagle - Romulus
 Roscommon Roscommon County Voice Houghton Lake Resorter & Roscommon County Herald-News - Roscommon
 Gazette van Detroit - Roseville
 Roseville-Eastpointe Eastsider - Roseville
 Daily Tribune - Royal Oak
 Royal Oak Review - Royal Oak
 Southfield Eccentric - Royal Oak
 The Saginaw News - Saginaw
 The Township View - Saginaw
 The Valley Vanguard - Saginaw Valley State University
 Saline Reporter - Saline
 Sanilac County News - Sandusky
 Sandusky Tribune & Deckerville Recorder & Marlette Leader - Sandusky
 Sanilac County Jeffersonian - Sandusky
 The Commercial Record  - Saugatuck
 The Evening News - Sault Sainte Marie
 South County News - Schoolcraft
 The Connection - Schoolcraft College
 Newsweekly - Sebewaing
 The South Independent - Shaftsburg
 Shelby-Utica News - Shelby
 The Southwester - Southwestern Michigan College
 Erie Square Gazette - St. Clair County Community College
 St. Clair Shores Sentinel - St. Clair Shores
 The St. Ignace News - St. Ignace
 The Herald-Palladium - St. Joseph
 Trade Lines - St. Joseph
 South Lyon Herald - South Lyon
 The Jewish News - Southfield
 Southfield Eccentric  - Southfield
 Southfield Sun - Southfield
 The Heritage Sunday - Southgate
 The News-Herald - Southgate
 South Haven Tribune - South Haven
 Northwest Advance - Sparta
 Springport Signal - Springport
 Menominee County Journal - Stephenson
 Sterling Heights Sentry - Sterling Heights
 Town Crier - Stockbridge
 Sturgis Journal - Sturgis
 Swartz Creek View - Swartz Creek
 West Bloomfield Beacon - Sylvan Lake
 Iosco County News-Herald - Tawas City
 Tecumseh Herald - Tecumseh
 Bedford Now - Temperance
 The South County Gazette - Three Oaks
 Three Rivers Commercial-News - Three Rivers
 Grand Traverse Business News - Traverse City
 Grand Traverse Herald - Traverse City
 Northern Express - Traverse City
 Traverse City Record-Eagle - Traverse City
 Nordamerikansiche Wochen-post - Troy
 Oakland Observer - Troy
 Troy Eccentric - Troy
 Troy-Somerset Gazette - Troy
 Troy Times - Troy
 The Oakland Press - Troy
 Hometown Gazette - Union City
 The Varsity News - University of Detroit Mercy
 The Michigan Daily - University of Michigan
 Source/Advisor Newspaper - Utica
 Shelby-Utica News - Utica
 Vanderbiltmich.com - Vanderbilt
 Pioneer Times - Vassar
 The South Independent - Vernon
 South County News - Vicksburg
 Grand Valley Advance - Walker
 Northwest Advance - Walker
 Warren Weekly - Warren
 Washtenaw Voice - Washtenaw Community College
 Spinal Column Newsweekly - Waterford
 The Oakland Press - Waterford
 Penasee Globe - Wayland
 Journal Newspaper - Wayne
 The South End - Wayne State University
 West Bloomfield Eccentric - West Bloomfield
 West Bloomfield Beacon - West Bloomfield
 Northwest Advance - West Grand Rapids
 Westland Observer - Westland
 White Lake Beacon - Whitehall
 Williamston Enterprise - Williamston
 El Informador - Wyoming, Michigan
 Southwest Advance - Wyoming
 The Yale Expositor - Yale
 Ypsilanti Courier - Ypsilanti
 Zeeland Record'' - Zeeland

See also
Media in Detroit
Media in Grand Rapids, Michigan

References

External links
 . (Survey of local news existence and ownership in 21st century)

Mass media in Michigan